The Kiel University of Applied Sciences (German: Fachhochschule Kiel) is a University of Applied Sciences, established in 1969. It is one of three public institutions of higher learning in Kiel, Germany. 
It provides around 30 Bachelor‘s and Master‘s degrees, supplementary degrees and continuing education courses by the faculties of Agriculture, Business Management, Computer Science & Electrical Engineering, Mechanical Engineering, Media and Social Work and Health.   there are 7824 students enrolled. 

The campus contains one large and a few smaller cafeterias, as well as two dorms. Furthermore, a planetarium, called the Mediendom, a museum of computers and a star observatory are associated with Fachhochschule.

In addition to the main campus in Kiel, the University of Applied Sciences has sites in Neumünster and Osterrönfeld.

Organization

Departments
The Fachhochschule Kiel is divided in the following departments:
 Agriculture
 Computer Science and Electrical Engineering
 Manufacturing Systems Engineering
 Media
 Social Work
 Economics

Courses
38 different courses of studies are offered in the six different departments. Therefrom, 19 are Bachelor courses. 
Beneath typical courses like Economics and Social Work, there are also two maritime ones: Naval architecture and Technology and Offshore Technology which can only be studied at the FH Kiel.

International Relationships
All courses of studies are embossed by a strong international orientation. An integrated education of language in certain courses is only one example.

The Fachhochschule Kiel is in close contact to international universities. Thereby many student exchange programs as well as mutual recognition of study performances can be provided.
The International Office is coordinating approximately 530 students from over 80 different countries, organized by the Erasmus Programme.

Besides these efforts the Fachhochschule Kiel offers two entirely English-taught master's programs, Master of Science in Information Engineering and MASTER of  INDUSTRIAL ENGINEERING. The latter is an online degree programme.

Art and Cultural Features of the Campus

After having acquired three art pieces in 1994 due to wish of the Ministry of Education, Science and Cultural Affairs to present the Campus of the University of Applied Sciences it started to expand the collection more and more. Today more than 300 pieces of art can be found under the title of “CampusKunst-D 450 Kunstwerke” (CampusArt-D 450 pieces of art) on the Campus.

Under the title “Cultural Isle of Dietrichsdorf” (Kulturinsel Dietrichsdorf) the Fachhochshule maintains several cultural establishments that do not only aim to provide cultural enrichment for the students but to the general people, too. That Among these are the Mediadome, a computer museum and an astronomical observatory. In addition to that, the administration began establishing a centre of culture and communication  in an old air raid shelter called Bunker-D in 2006. Since 2014 the building contains a café, a cinema and a gallery with frequently changing exhibitions. In September 2015 a sculpture named KUBUS BALANCE by HD Schrader, which had been made in 1990, was placed on top of the building.

Print Media
Since September 2010 the campus magazine "viel." is published once a semester. Its focus is on Education, research and projects on the campus but also features more general topics. The editorial staff is composed of students and employees of the University’s marketing and communications department.

The student magazine "plietsch" ist a project of the Faculty of Media. Taking part in the respective elective module students practically improve their knowledge and skills in layouting and writing the editorial. Contrary to the "viel.", which aims at a broad target group, the plietsch targets mainly students. Its first issue was published on 23 April 2015.

Student life
By the time, the students of the Fachhochschule Kiel have launched a variety of interdisciplinary activities.

Raceyard
Since 2006 the university’s racing team Raceyard takes part in the German Competition of the Formula Student Germany in Hockenheim and also in international Competitions such as the Formula SAE e.g. in Silverstone. The racing team has been awarded with the “Best Newcomer”- and “Acceleration”-Award by the Formular Student Germany respectively in 2006 and 2007. the Goblet of Acceleration in  Silverstone and Hockenheim were also successfully achieved by the team in 2009. Since 2011 Raceyard only builds electric racing cars.

Sports
In cooperation with the University Kiel (Christian-Albrechts-Universität zu Kiel), they offer a wide range of varies sport courses for a small budget. Students can choose every semester between attending these weekly courses or going in the gym right next to the University of Kiel.

Campus RadioAktiv
This is the campus radio, organized and made by students. It was founded in 2012 and is on air every Thursday morning. 
The project was launched by the Media department but can be visited by all students.

Campus-TV
Since 2008, students studying in the Media department produce journalistic video material which can be found on the website of the FH Kiel. They as well are published on YouTube since 2010.

Baltic Thunder 
In 2008 the Baltic Thunder team started to take part in the Racing Aeolus in Den Helder, Netherlands. Since 2016 the team enters the competition with two self-built vehicles.

TomKyle AUV
The TomKyle AUV Team is a student work group dedicated to the development and programming of Autonomous Underwater Vehicles  in collaboration with the GEOMAR Helmholtz Centre for Ocean Research. The project was initiated in January 2013 by the Faculty of Computer Sciences and Electrical Engineering.
In 2016 the group's AUV  won the second place at the SAUC-E competition.

References

External links

 The official Website of the University of Applied Sciences Kiel
 English information page of the University's General Student's Committee (AStA)
 Raceyard
 Baltic Thunder

Universities and colleges in Schleswig-Holstein
1969 establishments in Germany
Universities of Applied Sciences in Germany
Kiel